USS Keith may refer to the following ships of the United States Navy:

 , a United States Navy destroyer escort in commission from 1943 to 1946
 , the name of more than one United States Navy ship

United States Navy ship names